is a railway station on the Amagi Line located in Kiyama, Saga, Japan. It is operated by the Amagi Railway, a third sector public-private partnership corporation.

Lines
All Amagi Line trains stop at the station.

Layout
The station consists of a side platform serving a single track at grade. There is no station building but the platform is sheltered as it is located under an expressway overpass. Access to the platform is by means of a flight of steps or a ramp.

Platforms

Adjacent stations

History
Amagi Railway opened the station on 1 November 1987 as an added station on the existing Amagi Line track.

Surrounding area 
 Coca-Cola West Japan
 Toyo Seikan

References

Railway stations in Saga Prefecture
Railway stations in Japan opened in 1987